The Conductor is a 2012 Russian drama film directed by Pavel Lungin.

Plot 
The film tells about a conductor who goes to Jerusalem with his orchestra, but suddenly a tragedy happens.

Cast 
 Vladas Bagdonas as Vyacheslav Petrov
 Inga Strelkova-Oboldina as Alla
 Karen Badalov as Nikodimov
 Sergey Koltakov as Nadezhkin
 Sergey Barkovskiy as Pushenkov
 Darya Moroz as Olga
 Arseniy Spasibo as Senya
 Vsevolod Spasibo as Seva
 Ania Bukstein as Anna
 Andrei Sirotin as Dima
 Elena Antoshkina as Stewardess #2 (as Ye. Antoshkina)

References

External links 
 

2012 films
2010s Russian-language films
Russian drama films
Films set in Jerusalem
2012 drama films